In astrology, reception is a condition where one planet is located in a sign where a second planet has astrological dignity--for example, a sign which the second planet rules or in which it is exalted, or where the second planet is the triplicity ruler.

In such a case, the first planet is said to be "received" by the dignified planet, and this relationship was seen by ancient and medieval astrologers to function in a similar way to that of host and guest.  The dignified planet is strong, and hence provides support and assistance to the second planet which falls within its purview.

Sometimes this relationship is mutual—that is, each planet is in each other's sign of dignity. This condition is called mutual reception or "exchange of signs" and can be very beneficial to both planets.

Further reading
, On Reception, trans. Rob Hand, ARHAT (Archive for the Retrieval of Historical Astrological Texts) Publications, 1998. robhand.com
 William Lilly's use of Reception in Horary, by Deborah Houlding; Skyscript, 2005.
 A brief comparison of the use of reception by historical authors, by Deborah Houlding; Skyscript, 2005.
The Use of Reception between Dignities, by Deborah Houlding; Skyscript, 2015

References

Technical factors of Western astrology